Mariusz Cendrowski (born 20 October 1977) is a Polish former professional boxer who competed from 2004 to 2012. As an amateur, he competed in the men's light welterweight event at the 2000 Summer Olympics.

References

External links
 

1977 births
Living people
Polish male boxers
Olympic boxers of Poland
Boxers at the 2000 Summer Olympics
People from Lubin
Middleweight boxers
Light-middleweight boxers
Light-welterweight boxers
20th-century Polish people
21st-century Polish people